The Ube Kosan Open was a professional golf tournament that was held in Japan from 1972 until 2001. It was played at the Ube 72 Country Club near Ube, Yamaguchi. It was an event on the Japan Golf Tour.

In 1976, the Pepsi-Wilson Tournament, as it was then known, set a record for the longest sudden-death playoff in a major men's professional tournament. It took Peter Thomson fourteen holes to defeat Graham Marsh, Brian Jones and Shozo Miyamoto. This record still stands today.

Tournament hosts

Winners

Notes

References

External links
Coverage on Japan Golf Tour's official site

Former Japan Golf Tour events
Defunct golf tournaments in Japan
Sport in Yamaguchi Prefecture
Recurring sporting events established in 1972
Recurring sporting events disestablished in 2001
1973 establishments in Japan
2001 disestablishments in Japan